Nadji Anthony Jeter (born October 18, 1996) is an American actor. He is best known for providing the voice and motion capture for Sam in the action-adventure video game The Last of Us (2013) and Miles Morales in several Marvel projects since 2017. He was nominated for the BAFTA Award for Performer in a Leading Role for his performance as Morales in the 2020 video game Spider-Man: Miles Morales.

Early life
Nadji Anthony Jeter was born in Atlanta, Georgia, on October 18, 1996. At a young age, his parents noticed that he was talented in dancing, acting, and comedy. At age 9, he performed as a dancer at Usher's New Look Foundation Gala. He also performed as a dancing mascot for the Atlanta Hawks of the NBA. He moved to Los Angeles in 2007 to pursue his career.

Career
Alongside his most popular roles as the voice of Sam in the action-adventure video game The Last of Us (2013) and Miles Morales in the animated series Spider-Man (2017) and the video games Spider-Man (2018), Marvel Ultimate Alliance 3: The Black Order (2019), and Spider-Man: Miles Morales (2020), Jeter has live-action credits such as guest roles on episodes of the medical drama series Grey's Anatomy (2007) and the sitcom Everybody Hates Chris (2008). He appeared in the comedy films Grown Ups (2010) and Grown Ups 2 (2013), as well as the sitcom Reed Between the Lines (2011–2015). He has also starred in various national commercials and was the face of Coca-Cola in 2011.

Personal life
Jeter is a Star Power Ambassador for the Starlight Children's Foundation. He has been involved in Usher's New Look Foundation since the age of six, receiving the 2013 Global Youth Leadership Award for his work with the foundation.

In January 2015, Jeter was arrested at the age of 18 for allegedly driving under the influence of marijuana in Burbank, California. According to reports, he spent a night in jail before being released.

Filmography

Films

Television

Video games

References

External links

1996 births
Living people
African-American male actors
American male child actors
American male film actors
American male television actors
American male video game actors
American male voice actors
Male actors from Atlanta
21st-century American male actors
21st-century African-American people